Ernest Marie Eugène Adolphe Moreau de Melen (20 February 1879 in Herve – 17 January 1968) was a Belgian football player who competed in the 1900 Olympic Games.

In Paris he won a bronze medal as a member of Université de Bruxelles club team.

References

External links

1879 births
1968 deaths
Belgian footballers
Olympic bronze medalists for Belgium
Olympic footballers of Belgium
Footballers at the 1900 Summer Olympics
Olympic medalists in football
Medalists at the 1900 Summer Olympics
Association football defenders
Belgium international footballers
People from Herve
Footballers from Liège Province